Marsh Green is a small village about 8 miles east of Exeter and 4 miles west of Ottery St Mary in East Devon, England, at OS grid reference SY042936.

External links

Villages in Devon